Jacek Rempała (born 16 February 1971) is a former motorcycle speedway rider from Poland.

Career 
Rempała represented Poland during the 1991 Speedway World Team Cup. 

He rode in Poland for 27 years and spent much of it with Unia Tarnów. He won the 1991 Silver Helmet and the 1993 Bronze Helmet.

He first rode in Britain when he signed for the Ipswich Witches for the 1992 British League season. He did not return to Britain again until 2006, when he joined the Berwick Bandits.

Family
His brothers, Marcin Rempala, Grzegorz Rempała and Tomasz Rempała were also speedway riders. His son Krystian Rempala was tragically killed in a speedway accident while riding in Poland during 2016.

Major results

World Cup 
 1992 - 2nd place in Group C

References 

1971 births
Polish speedway riders
Berwick Bandits riders
Coventry Bees riders
Ipswich Witches riders
Sportspeople from Tarnów
Living people